Rhabdotis is a genus of the family Scarabaeidae.

It differs from Pachnoda by having the anterior edge of the clypeus tucked in and bilobed, a more elongated and oblique mesosternal projection, and a shiny green elytra punctate, striated and decorated with white dots and dashes.

List of the described species and subspecies

 Rhabdotis albinigra Burmeister, 1847
 Rhabdotis allardi Antoine, Beinhundner & Legrand, 2003
 Rhabdotis bouchardi Legrand, 1996
 Rhabdotis aulica (Fabricius, 1791)
 Rhabdotis aulica ssp. impunctata Allard, 1992
 Rhabdotis aulica ssp. perpunctata Allard, 1992
 Rhabdotis dargei Antoine, 2006
 Rhabdotis dechambrei Antoine, Beinhundner & Legrand, 2003
 Rhabdotis fortii Antoine, Beinhundner & Legrand, 2003
 Rhabdotis gemella Legrand, 1996
 Rhabdotis giannatelli Antoine, Beinhundner & Legrand, 2003
 Rhabdotis intermedia Burmeister, 1847
 Rhabdotis intermedia ssp. grandioris Allard, 1992
 Rhabdotis kordofana Allard, 1992
 Rhabdotis mirei Antoine, Beinhundner & Legrand, 2003
 Rhabdotis perdrix (Harold, 1879)
 Rhabdotis picta (Fabricius, 1775)
 Rhabdotis pontyi Vuilet, 1911
 Rhabdotis semipunctata (Fabricius, 1787)
 Rhabdotis sobrina (Gory & Percheron, 1833)
 Rhabdotis sobrina ssp. aethiopica Allard, 1992
 Rhabdotis ugandensis Antoine, Beinhundner & Legrand, 2003

References

Bibliography
 1. Allard (V.), The Beetles of the World, volume 12. Cetoniini 2 (Cetoniidae), 1992, Sciences Nat, Venette. 
 2. Antoine (Ph.) - 2006, Un nouveau Rhabdotis Burmeister, 1842 du Cameroun, Coléoptères, 12(15), pp. 215–216.
 3. Antoine (Ph.), Beinhundner (G.) & Legrand (J.-Ph.) - 2003, Contribution à la connaissance du genre Rhabdotis Burmeister : le groupe de Rhabdotis picta (F.), Coléoptères, 9(22), pp. 315–346.
 4. Legrand (J.-Ph.) - 1996, Deux nouvelles espèces du genre Rhabdotis (Burmeister), Coléoptères, 2(11), pp. 123–126.

Cetoniinae
Scarabaeidae genera